El Pedroso de la Armuña is a village and municipality in the province of Salamanca,  western Spain, part of the autonomous community of Castile-Leon.

Geography

The postal code is 37410.

Economy
The basis of the economy is agriculture.

References

Municipalities in the Province of Salamanca